Johan Du Preez (born 8 July 1936) is a former sprinter. He competed for Rhodesia in the men's 100 metres and men's 200 metres at the 1964 Summer Olympics. Representing Rhodesia and Nyasaland, he won a bronze medal in the 220 yards at the 1962 British Empire and Commonwealth Games. In 1962, he also finished fourth in the 4 × 110 yards relay (with Jeffery Smith, Danie Burger, and Roy Collins) and was eliminated in the quarter-finals of the 100 yards in Perth.

References

1936 births
Living people
Athletes (track and field) at the 1964 Summer Olympics
Rhodesian athletes
Olympic athletes of Rhodesia
Athletes (track and field) at the 1962 British Empire and Commonwealth Games
Commonwealth Games bronze medallists for Rhodesia and Nyasaland
Commonwealth Games medallists in athletics
Afrikaner people
White Rhodesian people
Place of birth missing (living people)
Medallists at the 1962 British Empire and Commonwealth Games